Klahr is an unincorporated community and census-designated place (CDP) in Blair County, Pennsylvania, United States. It was first listed as a CDP prior to the 2020 census.

The CDP is in southwestern Blair County, in the southern part of Greenfield Township. It sits at the head of the valley of Smoky Run, at the base of Spruce Knob, an eastern spur of Blue Knob, the second-highest summit in Pennsylvania. Smoky Run is a southeastward-flowing tributary of Beaverdam Creek, one of the main headwater tributaries of the Frankstown Branch of the Juniata River, part of the Susquehanna River watershed.

Locust Hollow Road is the main street through Klahr, leading north  to Ski Gap and southeast  to Cotton Town.

Demographics

References 

Census-designated places in Blair County, Pennsylvania
Census-designated places in Pennsylvania